Jiyuan is  a sub-prefecture-level city in northwestern Henan province, People's Republic of China. It borders the prefecture-level cities of Jiaozuo and Luoyang to the east and southwest respectively, as well as the province of Shanxi to the north.

Administration
The sub-prefecture-level city of Jiyuan administers 5 subdistrict and 11 towns. Jiyuan is named after the Ji river whose source is said to be a spring located on the west of the city.
Subdistricts

Towns

History
Jiyuan was a county belonging to Jiaozuo City in the past, then it was divided from the city. The former Ji River—one of the ancient "Four Rivers", alongside the Yangtze, Huai, and Yellow Rivers—originated around Jiyuan, which was the source of its name, Chinese for "Source of the Ji". (Today, the Ji has been entirely subsumed by the Yellow River, which shifted to the bed of the Ji during its massive 1852 flood.) According to the latest archaeological findings, as early as around 10,000 years ago, precisely at the end of the Paleolithic Period and the beginning of the Neolithic Period, people have lived here. It used to be the capital of the Xia Dynasty and was well known for its wealth between the Period of Warring States and Han Dynasty.

Agriculture
There are many crops grown in Jiyuan, such as wheat, peanut, cotton, sweet potato, maize and other crops.

Climate

Transportation
 Houma–Yueshan Railway
 Jiaozuo–Liuzhou Railway

External links
Government website of Jiyuan (available in Chinese only)

References

Citations

Bibliography
 .

 
Cities in Henan
County-level divisions of Henan
National Forest Cities in China